Uchter John Mark Knox, 5th Earl of Ranfurly  (14 August 1856 – 1 October 1933), was a British politician and colonial governor. He was Governor of New Zealand from 1897 to 1904.

Early life
Lord Ranfurly was born into an Ulster-Scots aristocratic family in Guernsey, the second son of The 3rd Earl of Ranfurly by his wife Harriet, daughter of John Rimmington, of Broomhead Hall, Yorkshire. He was educated at Harrow School. Becoming a cadet on board HMS Britannia, he passed for the Royal Navy, but, giving up a naval career, entered Trinity College, Cambridge, at the age of eighteen.

He succeeded in the earldom (and several subsidiary titles) in May 1875 when his elder brother died on a shooting expedition in Abyssinia. His family had owned a large country estate centred on Dungannon in the southeast of County Tyrone in Ulster since 1692.

Political career

Ranfurly served as a Lord-in-Waiting under Lord Salisbury between 1895 and 1897 and was knighted as a Knight Commander of the Order of St Michael and St George (KCMG) in 1897 for his public services. He was appointed to succeed The Earl of Glasgow as Governor of New Zealand on 6 April 1897, assuming office on 10 August. Lord Ranfurly became Honorary Colonel of the 1st Wellington Battalion (1898) and of the 1st South Canterbury Mounted Rifles (1902). He was created a Knight Grand Cross of the Order of St Michael and St George (GCMG) in June 1901, on the occasion of the visit of TRH the Duke and Duchess of Cornwall and York (later King George V and Queen Mary) to New Zealand. His term ended on 19 June 1904, when he personally handed over office to Lord Plunket. He is remembered for his donation of the Ranfurly Shield, a New Zealand sporting trophy.

On his return to England Ranfurly was made an Irish Privy Counsellor (1905); then for a time, he returned to farm in Mildura, Victoria, Australia. But he soon devoted more and more time to his other great interest, the Order of St. John of Jerusalem. In 1914 he was a Knight of Justice, and Registrar of the Order in London, becoming (1915–19) Director of its Ambulance Department. In 1919 the French Government made him an Officer of the Legion of Honour for his services in this connection during the war.

After the partition of Ireland, Lord Ranfurly was made a Privy Counsellor for Northern Ireland in 1923, also serving as Deputy Lieutenant and Justice of the Peace for his family's native County Tyrone. He continued his association with the Order of St. John, becoming Bailiff Grand Cross in 1926.

Lord Ranfurly died on 1 October 1933, aged 77, and was succeeded by his grandson, Daniel Knox, 6th Earl of Ranfurly.

Family
Lord Ranfurly married the Honourable Constance Elizabeth Caulfeild, only child of James Alfred Caulfeild, 7th Viscount Charlemont, on 10 February 1880. They had four children:

Thomas Uchter Knox, Viscount Northland (1882–1915)
Lady Annette Agnes (1880–1886)
Lady Constance Harriet Stuart (1885–1964)
Lady Eileen Maud Juliana (1891–1972)

One of the tiny subantarctic Bounty Islands was named after him: Ranfurly Island.

Awards and decorations
 Knight Grand Cross of the Order of St Michael and St George (June 1901)
 Privy Counsellor (Ireland) (23 August 1905)
 Officer of the Legion of Honour (France, 1919)
 Privy Counsellor (Northern Ireland) (27 November 1923)
 Bailiff Grand Cross of the Venerable Order of St John (1927)

References

NZETC – Uchter Knox, 5th Earl of Ranfurly 1856–1933 (Person) – Victoria University of Wellington
NZETC – The Cyclopedia of New Zealand (Auckland Provincial District) Uchter John Mark – Victoria University of Wellington
RANFURLY, Sir Uchter John Mark Knox, Fifth Earl of, P.C., G.C.M.G., Bailiff Grand Cross of the Order of St. John, Deputy Lieutenant and Justice of the Peace, County Tyrone by Bernard John Foster, M.A., Research Officer, Department of Internal Affairs, Wellington.

External links

 

1856 births
1933 deaths
Guernsey people
People educated at Harrow School
Alumni of Trinity College, Cambridge
Bailiffs Grand Cross of the Order of St John
Knights Grand Cross of the Order of St Michael and St George
Officiers of the Légion d'honneur
Governors-General of New Zealand
Conservative Party (UK) Baronesses- and Lords-in-Waiting
Members of the Privy Council of Ireland
Members of the Privy Council of Northern Ireland
Deputy Lieutenants of Tyrone
Earls of Ranfurly